Bergheim is an unincorporated community in eastern Kendall County, Texas, United States known for its German-Texan culture and heritage.  It lies along State Highway 46 east of the city of Boerne, the county seat of Kendall County.  Its elevation is 1,437 feet (438 m). Although Bergheim is unincorporated, it has a post office, with the ZIP code of 78004; the ZCTA for ZIP Code 78004, consisting mostly of rural land, had a population of 1,183 at the 2010 census. The community is part of the San Antonio metropolitan statistical area. Bergheim is still a predominantly a ranching and agricultural community.

Bergheim, meaning "Mountain Home" in German, was founded by Austrian immigrant Andreas Engel, who moved to the area and established a store before 1900. The community's post office was established in 1901. Ranching has long been the mainstay of Bergheim's economy, although the harvesting of cedar (juniper) lumber has been important at certain times in its history.

Major highways
 State Highway 46
 Farm to Market Road 3351

Education
The community is served by the Boerne Independent School District.

Historical Population

References

External links
Profile of Bergheim from the Handbook of Texas Online

Austrian-American culture in Texas
Unincorporated communities in Kendall County, Texas
Unincorporated communities in Texas
Greater San Antonio